Cignature (commonly stylized in all lowercase) is a South Korean girl group composed of Chaesol, Jeewon, Seline, Chloe, Belle, Semi and Dohee. Formed by C9 Entertainment and managed under their exclusive girl group sub-label J9 Entertainment, the group made their debut on February 4, 2020, with their debut single "Nun Nu Nan Na".

History

2019: Pre-debut and introduced 
Chaesol, Jeewon (formerly known as Jiwon), Ye Ah (formerly known as Haeun), Sunn (formerly known as Viva) and Belle (formerly known as Lucky) were members of Good Day under C9 Entertainment, which debuted on August 30, 2017. Chaesol, Jeewon, Sunn and Belle had taken part in KBS2 reality television series The Unit.

On November 11, 2019, C9 Entertainment confirmed the launching of future girl group temporarily named C9 Girlz, with Jeewon being named the first member of the future girl group, confirming Good Day's disbandment. Subsequently, from November 12 to 17, the remaining members were introduced in the order: Semi, Chaesol, Sunn, Belle, Ye Ah, and Seline.

2020–2021: Debut and early days 
On January 14, the group's name was revealed to be Cignature. On February 4, the group released their debut lead single A "Nun Nu Nan Na", while the song's full music video was released one day earlier, on February 3.Following their debut lead single B "Assa" was released on April 7. Its full music video was released on April 6, one day before the song's release date.The group released their first EP, Listen and Speak was released on September 22,with "Arisong" as the lead single. The EP also including their previous debut singles. The promotion of the EP featured a schoolgirl concept, and Whosfan, a fan-focused platform, held a promotional event for them.The EP received positive reviews, with the reviews from several news reporters describing it as refreshing, youthful, and having a unique expression method. On September 23, the demand for the EP exceeded demand forecast calculated by J9 Entertainment, and the first batch sold out. The music video for "Arisong" has reached 3 million views within two days of its release. Listen and Speak reached no. 21 on the Gaon Album Chart.

On April 27, 2021, J9 Entertainment announced that Ye Ah and Sunn had left the group and terminated their contracts with the agency due to undisclosed reasons.

On June 14, J9 Entertainment announced that two new members, Chloe and Dohee, had been added to the group.

On November 30, the group released their second EP, Dear Diary Moment, with the lead single "Boyfriend".

2023: My Little Aurora
Cignature returned after 14 months with their third EP My Little Aurora was released on January 17, 2023. The EP consists of four track including the lead single "Aurora".

Members
Current
Chaesol
Jeewon
Seline
Chloe
Belle
Semi
Dohee

Former
Ye Ah
Sunn

Timeline

Discography

Extended plays

Singles

Awards and nominations

Notes

References

K-pop music groups
2020 establishments in South Korea
Musical groups established in 2020
South Korean girl groups